Rowing at the 1960 Summer Olympics featured 7 events, for men only. The competitions were held from 30 August to 3 September on the Lago di Albano.

Medal summary

Men's events

Participating nations

A total of 410 rowers from 33 nations competed at the Rome Games:

Medal table

Notes
 Conflicting sources: Some sources list Lorne Loomer as a silver medalist in eights at the 1960 Summer Olympics in Rome, as a member of the Canadian team. However, according to other sources Loomer competed in coxless pairs, but was replaced by substitute David Anderson in the coxed eights.

References

External links
 International Olympic Committee medal database

 
1960 Summer Olympics events
1960
Summer Olympics